The Sutherland spaceport, also known as Space Hub Sutherland or UKVL Sutherland, is planned to be the first spaceport of the United Kingdom. It would be operated by a commercial entity and would employ 40 people. The spaceport will host a launch vehicle called Orbex Prime. The spaceport will be located on the A' Mhòine peninsula northwest of Tongue village, Sutherland, Scotland. , construction was set to begin in late 2022, with a first launch expected before the end of 2023.

Overview
The facility would be operated by a commercial Launch Pad Operator, who has yet to be appointed. The proposed spaceport is expected to employ some 40 people directly and with another 400 jobs supported indirectly. It will be built through the local development agency, the Highlands and Islands Enterprise (HIE).

The submitted planning application shows that the spaceport will host a planned new rocket called Prime by the startup company Orbex. The facility was originally planned to be shared by both Orbex and Lockheed Martin, and to potentially use two separate launch pads, as the two rockets use different propellants. However, the final planning application includes only one launch pad. In October 2020, the UK Space Agency announced that Lockheed Martin had selected Shetland Space Centre on Unst, while Orbex will remain at Sutherland.

Location 

The location at A' Mhòine peninsula was considered alongside two other Scottish locations: Unst, Shetland and North Uist, Western Isles, and is the only one of these three on the mainland. For all three locations the particular value is in having a clear northern coast which allows rockets to launch due north without problems from land areas under the flight path. The northerly flight path can place small satellites into polar orbit and Sun-synchronous orbit.

The nearest community to the spaceport is the crofting township of Talmine, alongside the Kyle of Tongue, with a population of 200. The space hub proposed site is within the  Melness Crofters Estate, of which  will be leased to HIE and enclosed to secure the spaceport infrastructure. The surrounding land is common grazing for the crofters, who will be required (with due compensation) to clear livestock from a wider exclusion zone on launch days. Permission has been granted for a maximum of 12 launches per year from the spaceport.

Launch operation
The spaceport will be owned and operated by Highlands and Islands Enterprise, with a commercial operator having been sought but not appointed as of November 2020. Also as of 2020 it is expected that it will only be used to launch Orbex Prime rockets, from a single launch pad. Using bio-propane, the Orbex Prime rocket aims to have a significantly lower carbon impact compared to other rocket fuels. The rockets and engines are to be made at Orbex's Forres manufacturing plant, near Inverness, using 3D printing. They are aiming for re-usability for the booster stage, and full mass recovery so that no rocket materials are left on land or sea or in space. The first three launches, which are projected to start by the end of 2022, would carry payloads up to 125 kg, to allow for testing margins and extra instrumentation. Amongst the six contracts that Orbex had signed up for satellite launches is In-Space Missions, who have booked the second flight for the launch of their Faraday-2b spacecraft which itself holds six or more cubesats. When fully operational the Orbex Prime is expected to have a payload capacity of 180 kg.

Around launch days the crofters will be required, with due compensation, to clear their livestock from an exclusion zone.

The three enclosed areas will all be accessed from a new roadway running north-west from the A838. Alongside the entranceway will be the Launch Operations Control Centre (LOCC). This is to have low visual impact from the road, with a planted Green roof housing facilities to control the launch and panoramic glass windows facing towards the launchpad. Some 2 km north-west is the Launch Site Integration Facility (LSIF), including a building for assembly of launch vehicles and their payloads and an Antennae Park with satellite tracking and telemetry equipment. Around 0.5 km north of the LSIF, linked by an access rail, will be the launchpad, incorporating facilities for storage and management of the bio-propane and liquid oxygen.

History
The proposed site was first announced in July 2018 at the Farnborough Air Show and had hoped it might be ready for first launches in 2020. The project was initially called UKVL Sutherland, with the development agency Highlands and Islands Enterprise (HIE) working in conjunction with the UK Space Agency, and two  potential launch operators, Orbex and Lockheed Martin. The proposed cost of the spaceport construction was £17.3 million, with £2.5 million to be provided by the UK government. The expectation was that two launch pads would be required, to cope with the different fuel types, namely bio-propane for Orbex, and RP-1 for Lockheed Martin's as yet undisclosed vehicle.

Initially there was mixed support amongst the local crofters. In November 2018, the Melness Crofters Estate (MCE) voted on whether to continue discussions about the proposal. Twenty-seven votes were cast in favour, with eighteen against and one spoiled ballot.

On 31 July 2019 HIE signed a lease for the proposed site with the Melness Crofters Estate and in September 2019 they began a formal public consultation phase, ahead of the formal application for planning consent, which was filed in December 2019. Planning permission was granted by Highland Council on 5 August 2020 after the Scottish government chose to make no interventions on the decision. Application had then to be made to the Scottish Land Court to get permission to enclose the common grazing land, at a hearing still to held. With regulator approval to move forward, construction was planned to begin in 2021 with the hope of a first launch before the end of 2022. The planning consent was for a single launchpad and an upper limit of 12 flights per year.

In October 2020 Lockheed Martin announced that they were pulling out of the Sutherland Space Hub partnership and had shifted their plans in favour of a launch from the Shetland Space Centre (SSC) on the island of Unst. The reasons for this appear to relate to the difficulties of having only a single launch pad and a restricted number of launch dates. By using the Shetland site, which aims to be specifically geared up for multiple launch providers with potentially three launch pads and fewer launch restrictions, Lockheed Martin hoped to avoid the possible backlog of launch dates that might have resulted at Sutherland Space Hub.

See also
SaxaVord Spaceport (formerly Shetland Space Centre)
Space industry of Scotland

References

Sutherland
Spaceports in Europe
Space programme of the United Kingdom